The Fifth Child is a short novel by the British writer Doris Lessing, first published in the United Kingdom in 1988, and since translated into several languages. It describes the changes in the happy life of a married couple, Harriet and David Lovatt, as a consequence of the birth of Ben, their fifth child. A sequel, Ben, in the World (2000) recounts Ben's life after he has left his family.

Plot

When David Lovatt meets Harriet at an office party, they both immediately fall in love. They both share the same conservative outlooks, which they perceive to be a rarity in the London of the 1960s.

The two marry and purchase a large house in a small town within commuting distance of London. The couple intends to have several children—a wish frowned upon by the rest of the family. By the time they have four children–two boys and two girls–their house becomes a centre of joy not only for them but for all their relatives and friends who come and visit. This continues until Harriet has a fifth, wildly dysfunctional child, Ben. Her painful pregnancy with him marks the beginning of the misery and suffering that this child brings to the whole family.

Characters
Harriet Lovatt. Main female character. Married to David Lovatt
David Lovatt. Main male character. Married to Harriet Lovatt
Luke. Harriet's and David's first child
Helen. Harriet's and David's second child
Jane. Harriet's and David's third child
Paul. Harriet's and David's fourth child
Ben. Harriet's and David's fifth child and the focus of the story
James Lovatt. David's and Deborah's father. He has divorced Molly and married Jessica instead.
Molly. 
Deborah Lovatt. David's sister
Dorothy. Harriet's mother
Sarah. Harriet's sister. She is married to William and has children with him, one being Amy, who has Down syndrome.
Angela. Harriet's sister
John. A young man who takes care of Ben. He goes away to Manchester for a job-training offer.
Mary Jones. A girl Ben injures
Dr. Gilly. A specialist that Harriet and Ben see in London
Billy, Derek, Vic, and Elvis. Several boys whose gang Ben joins when he's older

References

Novels by Doris Lessing
Jonathan Cape books
1988 British novels
1988 fantasy novels